Mow is a village in the Gaya district of Bihar, India, on the Gcleaaya-Kurtha Road. It is about 5 km from the city of Tekari and around 35 km from Gaya City.

The primary source of income in Mow is agriculture. The main crops include rice, wheat, pulses, and sugarcane. The crops in Mow are irrigated by a canal originating from the Sone River.

Mow is one of the earliest electrified villages in the Gaya district, having received electricity in the early 1980s. 80% of the people in Mow are literate. The village has a government hospital, high school, government college, and a police station. The village is mainly populated by Bhumihar Brahmins.

References 

Villages in Gaya district